Starley Hope (born 3 October 1987) is an Australian singer and songwriter. She is best known for her 2016 debut single "Call on Me".

Early life
Starley Hope was born and raised in Sydney, New South Wales, to a Mauritian father and an Australian mother of Filipino and Japanese descent. She later moved to London to pursue a career in music, before moving back to Australia and signing with the label Tinted Records.

Career
Starley featured on Odd Mob's single "So Into You", the song was released on 8 April 2016. She released her debut single "Call on Me" on 29 July 2016 through Tinted Records. The song was re-released through Tinted Records and Epic Records on 13 October 2016.

In June 2018, Starley released "Love is Love". The track came six months after the Australian Marriage Law Postal Survey. Stanley said on a press release to promote the single: 
In July and August 2018, Starley supported Katy Perry on the Australian leg of her Witness Tour.

In November 2018, she appeared in the music video for "Baby" by Clean Bandit.

Starley released her debut album, One of One, on 25 September 2020.

On 15 October 2020, Starley appeared on episode four of the sixth season of The Bachelorette Australia. She performed atop the Sydney Harbour Bridge for Bachelorette Becky and Pete during their date.

In September 2022 Starley teamed up with double platinum music producer Jolyon Petch for their original single "I Just Want Your Touch" on Central Station Records.  The single would go on to hold the #1 spot on the ARIA club singles chart for 5 weeks consecutively

Personal life
Starley told her family she was bisexual in 2017. She had previously dated men and told Star Observer that her family were "surprised" and her announcement was a "big deal for them". In 2018, Starley performed at the Sydney Mardi Gras for the first time and was the co-headline act at the official party.

Discography

Albums

Singles

As lead artist

As featured artist

Awards

AIR Awards
The Australian Independent Record Awards (commonly known informally as AIR Awards) is an annual awards night to recognise, promote and celebrate the success of Australia's Independent Music sector.

|-
| AIR Awards of 2017
| "Call on Me"
| Best Independent Dance/Electronic Club Song or EP
| 
|-

ARIA Music Awards
The ARIA Music Awards is an annual awards ceremony that recognises excellence, innovation, and achievement across all genres of Australian music. 

! Lost to
|-
| 2017
| "Call on Me"
| Song of the Year
| 
| Peking Duk - "Stranger (with Elliphant)"
|-

Notes

References

External links
 Starley on Facebook

1987 births
Living people
Singers from Sydney
Australian singer-songwriters
Australian LGBT singers
Bisexual musicians
21st-century Australian singers
21st-century Australian women singers
Australian people of Mauritian descent
Australian people of Filipino descent
Australian people of Japanese descent
Australian women singer-songwriters